Connor Rhys Brown (born 28 April 1997) is a Welsh cricketer. He made his first-class debut on 28 March 2017 for Cardiff MCCU against Glamorgan as part of the Marylebone Cricket Club University fixtures. He made his List A debut for Glamorgan in the 2018 Royal London One-Day Cup on 30 May 2018. Brown was released by Glamorgan ahead of the 2021 County Championship.

References

External links
 

1997 births
Living people
Cardiff MCCU cricketers
Cricketers from Caerphilly County Borough
Glamorgan cricketers
Sportspeople from Caerphilly
Wales National County cricketers
Welsh cricketers